The Helmi Stream is a stellar stream of the Milky Way galaxy. It started as a dwarf galaxy, now absorbed by the Milky Way as a stream. It was discovered in 1999, is formed of old stars deficient in heavy elements, and has a mass of 10 to 100 million solar masses. It was absorbed by the Milky Way some 6 to 9 billion years ago. 

The stream was named after Amina Helmi, who discovered this stellar stream after noticing this group of stars all moving at the same speed and in the same direction. The Helmi Stream discovery affirmed theories that the merging of galaxies played a significant role in creating the giant structures of the Milky Way galaxy.

Extragalactic planet
The Helmi stream was home to the first planet purportedly of extragalactic origin, orbiting the star HIP 13044. Further analysis of radial velocity data failed to confirm the discovery.

See also
 List of stellar streams

References

Stellar streams
Milky Way